Cyrille-Émile Vaillancourt (March 20, 1848 – June 7, 1912) was a physician and political figure in Quebec. He represented Dorchester in the House of Commons of Canada from 1891 to 1896 as a Nationalist member.

He was born in Saint-Roch, Canada East. In 1872, he married Marie-Louise Larochelle. He set up practice at Saint-Anselme in 1873 and later served as mayor and then registrar for Dorchester County. Vaillancourt ran unsuccessfully for reelection to the House of Commons in 1896 and 1904.

His son Cyrille later served in the Canadian senate.

References 

The Canadian parliamentary companion, 1891, AJ Gemmill

External links 
 Cyrille Émile Vaillancourt, Canadian historical portraits, Ville de Montréal

1848 births
1912 deaths
Members of the House of Commons of Canada from Quebec
Mayors of places in Quebec
Nationalist MPs